SC 11, SC-11, SC.11, SC11 or variants may refer to:

 SC 11, South Carolina Highway 11
 SC11, a FIPS 10-4 region code, see List of FIPS region codes (S–U)
 SC-11, a subdivision code for the Seychelles, see ISO 3166-2:SC
 (17457) 1990 SC11, an asteroid